909 Walnut (formerly Fidelity National Bank & Trust Building, Federal Office Building and 911 Walnut) is a twin-spired, 35-story,  residential skyscraper in Downtown Kansas City, Missouri. It was Missouri's tallest apartment building until the conversion of the Kansas City Power & Light building and the tenth-tallest habitable building in Missouri.

In 1997, the building was added to the National Register of Historic Places.

History
The structure was built in 1931 as the Fidelity National Bank & Trust Building (referred to locally as the Fidelity Building) at an estimated cost of $2.85 million, including bank fixtures. The site had previously been a two-story post office and federal building until 1904, when Fidelity purchased the site for its headquarters. The two-story building was razed in 1930. The new building mimicked the original federal twin-spire structure, in an Art Deco-Gothic Revival architectural motif.

The building's architect — Hoit, Price & Barnes — also designed the nearby Power and Light Building in the Art Deco style.

The bank was liquidated in 1933 during the Great Depression.

On June 14, 1946, under the administration of then-U.S. President Harry S. Truman, the Federal Government acquired the building at a report price of $3.3 million. As a result, it was renamed the Federal Office Building.

In 1954, the headquarters of the newly formed Severe Local Storms Warning Service of the United States Weather Bureau moved to the building from Washington, D.C. A Radome for a weather radar was constructed between the towers on a steel skeleton rising above them, creating a landmark until 1995 when it was removed and the service relocated to Norman, Oklahoma, where it became the Storm Prediction Center.

Another distinctive landmark was the "town clock" in the north tower, which had first started keeping time in the original 1885 post office and was then placed in the tower. A bell cast by the McShane Bell Company of Baltimore, Maryland chimed in 1882.  The clock face has since been removed and replaced by large windows for the highest residential living unit within five states. The bell was sold by the former owner in 2000 and was whisked away by helicopter in ignominious fashion.

When the government left the building in 1995, Northland Management & Investment of Kansas City purchased it for $500,000. The building remained vacant until it was sold in 2000 to Simbol Commercial Inc. of Dallas for $2 million. Following the September 11 attacks, the building was renamed from 911 Walnut to 909 Walnut. The rooftop of the garage also includes a  award-winning garden.

The first four floors are occupied by Entertainment Properties Trust (NYSE:EPR).

References

Kansas City, Missouri; An Architectural History, 1826-1990. (Copyright 1992). George Ehrlich. Retrieved August 11, 2007. (Pages 95–97)
American Institute of Architects Guide to Kansas City Architecture & Public Art. (Copyright 2000). American Institute of Architects/KC. Retrieved August 11, 2007. (Page 30, Number 42)

External links

909walnut.com
Skyscaperpage.com profile
Kansas City Public Library Resources on original federal building

Bank buildings on the National Register of Historic Places in Missouri
Residential buildings completed in 1931
Skyscrapers in Kansas City, Missouri
Gothic Revival architecture in Missouri
Art Deco architecture in Missouri
National Register of Historic Places in Kansas City, Missouri
Residential skyscrapers in Missouri
Downtown Kansas City